Li Chi-Tak (b. June 24, 1965) is a Hong Kong comic artist.

Comics 
 Black Mask, a superhero comic adapted into two movies Black Mask and Black Mask 2: City of Masks

External links
 
 Li Chi-Tak blog site
 Li Chi-Tak Lambiek Bio

Hong Kong artists
Hong Kong comics artists
Living people
1965 births